The Palais Brongniart housed the historical Paris stock exchange. It is located at the Place de la Bourse, in the II arrondissement, Paris.

Early history
Historically, stock trading took place at several spots in Paris, including rue Quincampoix, rue Vivienne (near the Palais Royal), and the back of the Opéra Garnier (the Paris opera house).

Architecture
In the early 19th century, the Paris Bourse's activities found a stable location at the Palais Brongniart, or Palais de la Bourse, built to the designs of architect Alexandre-Théodore Brongniart from 1808 to 1813 and completed by Éloi Labarre from 1813 to 1826.

Brongniart had spontaneously submitted his project, which was a rectangular neoclassical Roman temple with a giant Corinthian colonnade enclosing a vaulted and arcaded central chamber. His designs were greatly admired by Napoleon and won Brongniart a major public commission at the end of his career. Initially praised, the building was later attacked for academic dullness. The authorities had required Brongniart to modify his designs, and after Brongniart's death in 1813, Labarre altered them even further, greatly weakening Brongniart's original intentions.  From 1901 to 1905, Jean-Baptiste-Frederic Cavel designed the addition of two lateral wings, resulting in a cruciform plan with innumerable columns. According to the architectural historian Andrew Ayers, these alterations "did nothing to improve the reputation of this uninspiring monument."

Operations

From the second half of the 19th century, official stock markets in Paris were operated by the Compagnie des agents de change, directed by the elected members of a stockbrokers' syndical council. The number of dealers in each of the different trading areas of the Bourse was limited. There were around 60 agents de change (the official stockbrokers). An agent de change had to be a French citizen, be
nominated by a former agent or his estate, and be approved by the Minister of Finance, and he was appointed by decree of the President of the Republic. Officially, the agents de change could not trade for their own account nor even be a counterpart to someone who wanted to buy or sell securities with their aid; they were strictly brokers, that is, intermediaries. In the financial literature, the Paris Bourse is hence referred to as order-driven market, as opposed to quote-driven markets or dealer markets, where price-setting is handled by a dealer or market-maker. In Paris, only agents de change could receive a commission, at a rate fixed by law, for acting as an intermediary. However, parallel arrangements were usual in order to favor some clients' quote. The Commodities Exchange was housed in the same building until 1889, when it moved to the present Bourse de commerce.
Moreover, until about the middle of the 20th century, a parallel market known as "La Coulisse" was in operation.

Until the late 1980s, the market operated as an open outcry exchange, with the agents de change meeting on the exchange floor of the Palais Brongniart. In 1986, the Paris Bourse started to implement an electronic trading system. This was known generically as CATS (Computer Assisted Trading System), but the Paris version was called CAC (Cotation Assistée en Continu). By 1989, quotations were fully automated. The Palais Brongniart hosted the French financial derivatives exchanges MATIF and MONEP, until they were fully automated in 1998. In the late 1990s, the Paris Bourse launched the Euronext initiative, an alliance of several European stock exchanges.

See also

 List of works by James Pradier External sculpture
 Tribunal de commerce de Paris, hosted in the Palais Brongniart from 1826 to 1865

Notes

Sources

History 
 Lehmann, P.-J. 1991 La Bourse de Paris, Paris: Dunod.
 Lehmann, P.-J. 1997 Histoire de la Bourse de Paris, Paris: PUF.
 Muniesa, F. 2005 "Contenir le marché: la transition de la criée à la cotation électronique à la Bourse de Paris", Sociologie du Travail 47(4): 485-501.
 Walker, D. A. 2001 "A factual account of the functioning of the nineteenth-century Paris Bourse", European Journal of the History of Economic Thought 8(2): 186-207. mdr..

Structure 
 Ayers, Andrew (2004). The Architecture of Paris. Stuttgart; London: Edition Axel Menges. .
 Biais, B., Foucault, T. and Hillion, P. 1997 Microstructure des marchés financiers: institutions, modèles et tests empiriques, Paris: PUF.
 Hamon, J. 1995 Marché d'actions: architecture et microstructure, Paris: Economica.
 Hamon, J. and Jacquillat, B. 1992 Le marché français des actions: études empiriques 1977-1991, Paris: PUF.

Financial markets
Buildings and structures in Paris
Stock exchanges in Europe
Economy of Paris
Buildings and structures in the 2nd arrondissement of Paris
NYSE Euronext